Job Haskell was a member of the New York State Assembly and the Wisconsin State Assembly.

Biography
Haskell was born on September 10, 1794. During the War of 1812, he served with the United States Army. Conflicts he took part in include the Battle of Lundy's Lane. Haskell died on December 8, 1879.

Political career
Haskell was a member of the New York State Assembly in 1835 and the Wisconsin State Assembly in 1869. He was a Democrat.

See also
58th New York State Legislature

References

Democratic Party members of the New York State Assembly
Democratic Party members of the Wisconsin State Assembly
United States Army personnel of the War of 1812
1794 births
1879 deaths
19th-century American politicians